The Longwood Lancers men's basketball team is the Division I basketball team that represents Longwood University in Farmville, Virginia. Since 2012, the team has competed in the Big South Conference of the National Collegiate Athletic Association. Their current head coach is Griff Aldrich, a one-time lawyer and chief financial officer of a private equity firm who formerly served as the recruiting director for UMBC.

History
Longwood was an all-female school for the majority of its history; however, a limited number of male day students attended the school following World War II, and those students fielded a basketball team under the name Longwood Pioneers. The current NCAA men's basketball program began in 1976 under head coach Allan McNamee, when the school became fully co-educational that same year. The Lancers finished 1–6 against four year institutions in the inaugural season, and 2–9 overall. The Lancers were NCAA Division III members for their first four years. In 1980, they became Division II members, until 2004, when they began a transition to Division I membership. They became full Division I members in 2007.

In 2022, the Lancers won the Big South tournament and earned their first trip to the NCAA tournament as a Division I program. In the 2021-2022 season, Longwood had the best record in the Big South (15-1) and won the regular-season conference championship (North Division). In the Big South tournament championship, the team held the lead over Winthrop wire-to-wire through the entire game. 

The Lancers have been members of three conferences in their history: the Division II Mason–Dixon Conference from 1983 to 1988 (not to be confused with another defunct conference with the same name, which disbanded in 1974) and the-then Carolinas–Virginia Athletic Conference from 1995 to 2003. Longwood spent nine seasons as an independent during and after reclassification to Division I, until they joined the Big South Conference in 2012.

Longwood previously reached the NCAA tournament three times during its Division II history and once at the Division III level. In 1988, Longwood won a share of the Mason-Dixon Conference regular season title, and in 2001, won the CVAC tournament championship as a 3 seed.

The Lancers currently play in Willett Hall on Jerome Kersey Court, named after former Longwood basketball player and NBA star Jerome Kersey. In 2019, Longwood announced a $15 million donation to begin construction of a new, 72,000 square foot convocation and events center that will replace Willett Hall as the venue for Lancer basketball. The Joan Perry Brock Center, named after its benefactor, will seat up to 3,000, and is scheduled to open in 2023.

The Lancers have had nine different head coaches of their men's basketball team, as detailed below. The current head coach, former UMBC director of recruiting Griff Aldrich, joined the program in 2018.

Conference affiliations 
 1976–77 to 1980–81: NCAA Division III Independent
 1981–82 to 1982–83: NCAA Division II Independent
 1983–84 to 1987–88: Mason–Dixon Conference
 1988–89 to 1994–95: NCAA Division II Independent
 1995–96 to 2002–03: Carolinas–Virginia Athletic Conference
 2003–04: NCAA Division II Independent
 2004–05 to 2011–12: NCAA Division I Independent
 2012–13 to present: Big South Conference

Postseason

NCAA tournament results
The Lancers have appeared in one NCAA tournament. Their combined record is 0–1.

CBI
The Lancers have appeared in the Division I College Basketball Invitational (CBI) tournament two times. Their record is 1–2.

NCAA Division II tournament results
The Lancers have appeared in the NCAA Division II tournament three times. Their combined record is 2–4.

NCAA Division III tournament results
The Lancers appeared in the NCAA Division III tournament once. Their record is 3–2.

Coaches

Year-by-year records

Notable players

Jerome Kersey #54
Jerome Kersey is widely known as the best player in Longwood history. Playing from 1980 to 1984 Kersey set school records for points, rebounds, steals and blocked shots while making 57% of his baskets. As a senior, his rebounding average of 14.2 led all Division II players.

In 1984, Kersey was selected 46th overall in the NBA draft by the Portland Trail Blazers. He became a starter and was part of the nucleus of a strong Portland team, along with Clyde Drexler, Terry Porter, Buck Williams, and Kevin Duckworth that made it to the NBA Finals two out of the next three years (in 1990 and 1992). Kersey also finished second to Michael Jordan in the 1987 Slam Dunk Contest. In 1999, Kersey won an NBA Championship with the San Antonio Spurs. He would eventually retire in 2001 as a member of the Milwaukee Bucks.

In May 2006, Kersey graduated from Longwood, having only needed two more college courses to graduate for some years.

Kevin Jefferson #33
Kevin Jefferson played for the Lancers from 1986–1990. Jefferson ended his career with 1,806 career points, as record that would hold for 22 years.

Colin Ducharme #52
The 6'9" Ducharme would transfer to Longwood from the University of Virginia for his final year of eligibility in 2000. Ducharme averaged 19.6 points and 15.8 rebounds per game in his one year in Farmville. He led Longwood to a CVAC championship and an NCAA tournament appearance while being named the Division II National Player of the Year by multiple outlets. Ducharme remains only one of two retired numbers in Longwood history, with the other being Jerome Kersey.

Antwan Carter #4
Antwan Carter became the most efficient players in Longwood history and its best player so far in the Division I era. Playing from 2008–2012, Carter would break Kevin Jefferson's all-time scoring record and finished his career scoring 1,886 points. Carter also finished second in Longwood history in rebounds with 1,008.

Lauren “Judy” Barnaba #7
Barnaba Graduated in 2009 . In her time she enjoyed hanging out, painting and playing cards.  “Judy Windex” was banarbas’ monicker, due to her enhanced rebounding skills on both the offensive, and defensive glass. Which she attributes to her early days and core training she received from rebounding legend Klayvio Mcbarnaba.  They honed their skills behind the local Bob Evans family restaurant, located in Windexs’ home town of Bel Air, Maryland.

References

External links